Nelson Tyler is an engineer and inventor.

He was the designer and inventor of the PWC, Wetbike.  A personal watercraft that rides like a motorcycle.  He has developed gyro-stabilized camera systems for aerial use and won an Academy Award in 2005 for one designed to be used on a boat.  He developed a personal rocket pack which was used at the 1984 Olympics and in subsequent stunt flights.  He has developed jet packs for JetPack Aviation and is now working on an electric-powered personal air vehicle.

References

External links
 Jet Pack Dreamers – BBC documentary
 Tyler Camera Systems – details of his camera mounts and patents

American aerospace engineers
Jet pack
Recipients of the Scientific and Engineering Academy Award
Academy Award for Technical Achievement winners